One More Light Live is the third live CD compilation by American rock band Linkin Park, released on December 15, 2017.

Recorded during the band's European leg of their One More Light Tour in 2017, this is the first release since the death of lead singer Chester Bennington.

Background 
Linkin Park began their album tour in Buenos Aires, Argentina on May 6, 2017 at the Maximus Festival. They continued on with playing three more shows on the South American run before returning to the United States to play a few promo shows, including a performance on Jimmy Kimmel Live!.

The band set off for a one-month trip to Europe to play a total of 16 shows. The European Tour began in Bretigny, France on June 9, 2017. The tour took the band to numerous festivals including Download Paris, Hellfest, Impact, Southside and more. Linkin Park played back-to-back shows in London before the tour came to an end in Birmingham, England where Bennington's final performance with Linkin Park took place.

The band was scheduled to play in Manchester the following day but cancelled their performance due to the venue still being damaged from the May 2017 terrorist attack that occurred during Ariana Grande's concert.

On July 20, 2017, Bennington died by suicide in his Palos Verdes Estates home. In the wake of his death, Linkin Park cancelled the rest of the One More Light tour, which was set to begin a week after Bennington's death.

Track listing

Singles
"Crawling" and "Sharp Edges" were both released as promotional singles in December 2017.

Personnel
Linkin Park
 Chester Bennington – vocals, guitar (3, 6, 13)
 Rob Bourdon – drums (1-6, 9-12, 14-16)
 Brad Delson – guitars (1-7, 9-16); synthesizer (2)
 Dave "Phoenix" Farrell – bass guitar, backing vocals; sampler (10), guitar (9)
 Joe Hahn – turntables, samplers, backing vocals
 Mike Shinoda – vocals, keyboards (1-4, 6-9, 11, 14-15), guitar (10-12, 16)

Additional musicians
 Stormzy – guest vocals (10)

Production
 Mike Shinoda - mixing, production
 Joe Hahn - mixing, co-production

Charts

Weekly charts

Year-end charts

References

2017 live albums
Linkin Park albums
Warner Records live albums